The 2018–19 BCHL season is the 57th season of the British Columbia Hockey League (BCHL). The seventeen teams from the Interior, Island and Mainland divisions played 58-game schedules. The 2018 BCHL Showcase, hosted annually in Chilliwack, occurred shortly after the start of the season from September 20 to 22, 2018.

In March, the top teams from each division played for the Fred Page Cup, the BCHL Championship, won by the Prince George Spruce Kings. From there, they represented the league in the Doyle Cup, a best-of-seven series against the Alberta Junior Hockey League champion Brooks Bandits, normally to determine who represents the Pacific region in the National Junior A Championship. However, as the National Junior A Championship was being hosted in Brooks, Alberta, by the Brooks Bandits with the automatic hosts berth, the Spruce Kings were already guaranteed a spot in the tournament no matter the outcome. The Spruce Kings defeated the Bandits four games to two.

League changes
 Overtime consisted of a single five minute 3-on-3 overtime period, followed by a three player shootout.
 The league began using hybrid icing rules.

Standings
Note:  GP = Games Played, W = Wins, L = Losses, OTL = Overtime Losses, Pts = Points

Standings listed on the official league website.

Post-season

2019 BCHL Fred Page Cup playoffs
As of April 17, 2019

Doyle Cup

Award winners
Brett Hull Trophy (top scorer): Alex Newhook, Victoria
Best Defenceman: James Miller, Penticton
Bruce Allison Memorial Trophy (Rookie of the Year): Alexander Campbell, Victoria
Bob Fenton Trophy (most sportsmanlike): Mike Hardman, West Kelowna
Top Goaltender: Jack LaFontaine, Penticton
Wally Forslund Memorial Trophy (best goaltending duo): Jack LaFontaine and Derek Krall, Penticton
Vern Dye Memorial Trophy (regular season MVP): Alex Newhook, Victoria
Joe Tennant Memorial Trophy (Coach of the Year): Joe Martin, Merritt
Ron Boileau Memorial Trophy (best regular season record): Chilliwack Chiefs
Fred Page Cup (playoff champions): Prince George Spruce Kings

Players selected in 2019 NHL Entry Draft
 Rd1 16: Alex Newhook - Colorado Avalanche (Victoria Grizzlies)
 Rd3 65: Alexander Campbell - Nashville Predators (Victoria Grizzlies)
 Rd3 86: Layton Ahac - Vegas Golden Knights (Prince George Spruce Kings)
 Rd4 106: Carter Berger - Florida Panthers (Victoria Grizzlies)
 Rd5 134: Harrison Blaisdell - Winnipeg Jets (Chilliwack Chiefs)
 Rd5 144: Logan Neaton - Winnipeg Jets (Prince George Spruce Kings)
 Rd6 181: Kevin Wall - Carolina Hurricanes (Chilliwack Chiefs)
 Rd7 216: Massimo Rizzo - Carolina Hurricanes (Penticton Vees)

See also
2018 in ice hockey
2019 in ice hockey

References

External links
Official Website of the British Columbia Hockey League
Official Website of the Canadian Junior Hockey League

BCHL
British Columbia Hockey League seasons